This is a list of Global Force Wrestling events and specials, detailing all professional wrestling cards promoted, co-promoted or produced by Global Force Wrestling.

Pay-per-view specials

Live events

2015

2016

Co-promoted events

2016

2017

Produced events

Professional wrestling shows

Conventions and events

See also

List of All Elite Wrestling pay-per-view events
List of ECW supercards and pay-per-view events
List of FMW supercards and pay-per-view events
List of Impact Wrestling pay-per-view events
List of Major League Wrestling events
List of National Wrestling Alliance pay-per-view events
List of NJPW pay-per-view events
List of NWA/WCW closed-circuit events and pay-per-view events
List of Ring of Honor pay-per-view events
List of Smokey Mountain Wrestling supercard events
List of WCW Clash of the Champions shows
List of WWA pay-per-view events
List of World Class Championship Wrestling Supercard events
List of WWE pay-per-view and WWE Network events
List of WWE Saturday Night Main Event shows
List of WWE Tribute to the Troops shows

References

External links 

Events and specials
Professional wrestling-related lists
Professional wrestling in the Las Vegas Valley